Crashes to Light, Minutes to Its Fall is the fourth album by Cul de Sac, released in 1999 through Thirsty Ear Recordings.

Track listing

Personnel 
Cul de Sac
Robin Amos – synthesizers, sampler, autoharp
Michael Bloom – bass guitar
Glenn Jones – guitar, bouzouki
Jon Proudman – drums
Production and additional personnel
Colin Decker – mastering
Jon Williams – production, recording

References 

1999 albums
Cul de Sac (band) albums
Thirsty Ear Recordings albums